The 28th British Academy Film Awards, given by the British Academy of Film and Television Arts in 1975, honoured the best films of 1974.

Winners and nominees
BAFTA Fellowship: Jacques Cousteau

Statistics

See also
 47th Academy Awards
 27th Directors Guild of America Awards
 32nd Golden Globe Awards
 1st Saturn Awards
 27th Writers Guild of America Awards

Film028
1974 film awards
1975 in British cinema
1974 awards in the United Kingdom